Crab sticks, krab sticks, imitation crab (meat), or seafood sticks (originally known as kanikama in Japan) are a type of seafood made of starch and finely pulverized white fish (surimi) that has been shaped and cured to resemble the leg meat of snow crab or Japanese spider crab. It is a product that uses fish meat to imitate shellfish meat.

History
 of Japan first produced and patented imitation crab meat in 1974, as Kanikama. This was a flake type. In 1975, Osaki Suisan Co., Ltd., of Japan first produced and patented imitation crab sticks.

In 1977, The Berelson Company of San Francisco, California, US, working with Sugiyo, introduced them internationally. Kanikama is still their common name in Japan, but internationally they are marketed under names including Krab Sticks, Ocean Sticks, Sea Legs and Imitation Crab Sticks. Legal restrictions now prevent them from being marketed as "Crab Sticks" in many places, as they usually do not have crab meat.

Composition 
Most crab sticks today are made from Alaska pollock (Gadus chalcogrammus) of the North Pacific Ocean. This main ingredient is often mixed with fillers such as wheat, and egg white (albumen) or other binding ingredient, such as the enzyme transglutaminase. Crab flavoring is added (natural or more commonly, artificial)  and a layer of red food coloring is applied to the outside.

See also

 Fish ball
 Kamaboko
 Surimi

References

Further reading

Imitation crab meat. Retrieved April 18, 2014, from http://www.madehow.com/Volume-3/Imitation-Crab-Meat.html#b
Seafood Health Facts: Making Smart Choices. Retrieved April 29, 2014 from https://web.archive.org/web/20140509054612/http://seafoodhealthfacts.org/seafoodqa/23.php

Japanese cuisine
Seafood dishes
Surimi
Imitation foods